Durga Das Uikey (born 29 October 1963), also known as DD Uikey, is an Indian politician. He was elected to the Lok Sabha, lower house of the Parliament of India from Betul, Madhya Pradesh in the 2019 Indian general election as member of the Bharatiya Janata Party. He was well known teacher before entering in the politics.

References

External links
Official biographical sketch in Parliament of India website

India MPs 2019–present
Lok Sabha members from Madhya Pradesh
Living people
Bharatiya Janata Party politicians from Madhya Pradesh
People from Betul, Madhya Pradesh
1963 births